Dambudas (Urdu: دمبداس) is the capital city of Roundu District in Gilgit-Baltistan, Pakistan.

History 
In 2019, Roundu was made a district and Dambudas was made its capital.
total population approx 2lac according to 2020 survey
youth population 95% 
literacy rate 97% .
health facility nil
education complex . no major facility
many parent depend on private school and college.

References 

Populated places in Gilgit-Baltistan